The Lake may refer to:

Film and TV
 The Lake, a 2009 Warner Bros. web series starring Elisa Donovan
 The Lake (1998 film), a 1998 television film
 The Lake (2017 film), the working name of a French-American-German film renamed Renegades
The Lake (TV series), a 2022 Canadian television series for Amazon Prime Video

Literature and drama
 The Lake (play), a British play by Dorothy Massingham and Murray MacDonald
 The Lake (Kawabata novel), a 1954 novel by the Japanese writer Yasunari Kawabata
 The Lake (Yoshimoto novel), a 2015 novel by Japanese writer Banana Yoshimoto
 "The Lake" (short story), a short story by Ray Bradbury
The Lake, a radio play by Ned Chaillet
 The Lake, a school production by The Lakes South Morang P-9 School in Victoria, Australia

Music
 The Lake (EP), an EP by Antony and the Johnsons
 "The Lake", a song by Mike Oldfield from the album Discovery

Other uses
 107.7 (FM) The Lake, a Buffalo, New York radio station

See also
 The Lakes (disambiguation)
 Lake (disambiguation)